Ermes Bentivoglio (1475–1513) was an Italian condottiero,  the son of Giovanni II Bentivoglio, lord of Bologna, and Ginevra Sforza, daughter of Alessandro Sforza, lord of Pesaro.

Biography
Ermes was born in Bologna. In 1492 he was created knight by Ercole I d'Este and entered to the military service of the latter. Six years later, together with his father and brothers, he was made Imperial Knight by Emperor Maximilian I. He frequently fought alongside his elder brother Annibale.

In 1501, by order of his mother Ginevra, he had several members of the Marescotti family, rivals of the Bentivoglio, killed. In 1504 he married Iacopa Orsini, daughter of Giulio Orsini. In 1506, when Pope Julius II ordered the Bentivoglio to leave Bologna, he took refuge first in Ferrara and then in Mantua, together with Annibale. A reward was raised against them by the Pope; in spite of it, the two brothers repeatedly attempted to reconquer their city until they succeeded in 1511, thanks the help of the French. Annibale was declared new lord of Bologna; the following year, however, once the French left the population rose against them and the Bentivoglio had to leave the city forever.

Ermes Bentivoglio was killed in 1513 by Prospero Colonna in the battle of Olmo, near Vicenza. According to other sources, he drowned in the Bacchiglione river during the retreat after the battle of Creazzo against the Spaniards.

He is portrayed, as a child, in Lorenzo Costa the Elder's Bentivoglio Altarpiece in San Giacomo Maggiore.

See also
War of the League of Cambrai
Bartolomeo della Rocca

Sources
PAge at condottieridiventura.it 

1475 births
1513 deaths
Ermes
Military personnel from Bologna
15th-century condottieri
Italian military personnel killed in action
Military leaders of the Italian Wars
Nobility from Bologna
16th-century condottieri